The 2017 season was Palloseura Kemi Kings's second Veikkausliiga season since their promotion back to the top flight in 2015.

Squad

Transfers

Winter

In:

Out:

Summer

In:

Out:

Competitions

Veikkausliiga

The 2017 Veikkausliiga season began on 5 April 2017 and ended on 28 October 2017.

League table

Results summary

Results by matchday

Results

Finnish Cup

Sixth Round

Squad statistics

Appearances and goals

|-
|colspan="14"|Players away from the club on loan:
|-
|colspan="14"|Players who left PS Kemi Kings during the season:

|}

Goal scorers

Disciplinary record

References

2017
PS Kemi Kings